Jonathan Potter (born 8 June 1956) is Dean of the School of Communication and Information at Rutgers University and one of the originators of discursive psychology.

Life
Jonathan Potter was born in Ashford, Kent, and spent most of his childhood in the village of Laughton, East Sussex; his father was a school teacher and his mother was a batik artist.  He went to School in Lewes and then on to a degree in Psychology at the University of Liverpool in 1974 where he was exposed to the radical politics of the city, became (briefly) interested in alternative therapies, and responded to the traditional British empirical psychology that was the mainstay of the Liverpool psychology degree programme at the time.  He read the work of John Shotter, Kenneth Gergen and Rom Harré and became excited by the so-called crisis in social psychology.  This critical work led him to a master's degree in philosophy of science at the University of Surrey where he worked on speech act theory and had a first exposure to post structuralism and in particular the work of Roland Barthes.  He read and wrote about Thomas Kuhn, Paul Feyerabend and Imre Lakatos.  At the same time, philosophy of science provided a pathway to the new sociology of scientific knowledge and in particular to the work of Harry Collins, Michael Mulkay and Steve Woolgar.

In 1979 he applied for a PhD funding at the University of Bath to work with Harry Collins.  He was offered a place but in the summer of 1979 the offer was withdrawn after the incoming Thatcher government cut the budget for social science.  He started a part-time PhD with Peter Stringer in Psychology at the University of Surrey, while also working on a project on overseas tourists' experiences of Bath's bed and breakfast hotels.  In this period he met and started to live with Margaret Wetherell, who was doing a PhD with John Turner and was, with Howard Giles and Henri Tajfel, one of the key figures in British social psychology. He took part in the vibrant intellectual culture of social psychology in Bristol at the time although he was a lone voice against the broadly experimental focus of Bristol tradition of so-called European Social Psychology.

When Peter Stringer left Surrey to move to a Chair in the Netherlands Potter applied for DPhil funding again and started to work with Michael Mulkay at the University of York.  He worked within the sociology of scientific knowledge tradition, focusing on recordings of psychologists debating with one another at conferences. Increasingly that work evolved into an analysis of scientific discourse.

When Margaret Wetherell was appointed to a post in St Andrews University in 1980 he moved to Scotland, doing his PhD long distance.  In 1983 he gained his DPhil and started a temporary job whose primary duty was to teach statistics in the Psychological Laboratory (as the department was called at the time).  Covering the statistics allowed him a lot of flexibility in other teaching and he developed a course simply called Discourse which covered speech act theory, implicature, semiotics, post-structuralism, critical linguistics and conversation analysis.  The intensive engagement with this range of thinking influenced much of his later work.

After 4 years of temporary contracts at St Andrews he was offered a post at Loughborough University where he taught until July 2015, first as lecturer, then Reader in Discourse Analysis from 1992, then Professor of Discourse Analysis from 1996, and Head of Department from February 2010.  At Loughborough he worked with and was influenced by Derek Edwards, Michael Billig, Charles Antaki and, more recently, Elizabeth Stokoe.  Since 1996 he has lived with, and collabored with, Alexa Hepburn.  In the last decade he has taught workshops and short courses in Norway, Finland, Sweden, Denmark, Spain, Venezuela, New Zealand, Australia, US and the UK.

In 2005 his book Cognition and Conversation (jointly edited with Hedwig te Molder) received the inaugural prize of the American Sociological Association Ethnomethodology and Conversation Analysis section in 2007.  In 2008 he was elected to UK Academy of Social Sciences.

Work

In 1984 he published Social Texts and Context: Literature and Social Psychology with Margaret Wetherell and Peter Stringer.  This collaboration was devoped in parallel to Potter and Wetherell's PhD work.

He is co-author, with Margaret Wetherell of the influential book Discourse and Social Psychology which is one of the foundational texts that developed a discourse analytic approach to social psychology, a programme now refined into discursive psychology. It offered new ways of conceptualizing fundamental social psychological notions such as attitudes, categories, social representations and rules.  It has been cited more than three thousand times in more than a hundred different journals. One of its central achievements was to develop the analytic notion of 'interpretative repertoires' from Gilbert and Mulkay's work on scientific discourse and show how it could be more generally applied to social psychological topics.  A joint grant led by Margaret Wetherell resulted in the volume Mapping the Language of Racism in 1992 that focused on the way racism is displayed and legitimated in conversations, newspaper articles and parliamentary debates.

At the start of the 1990s, in the book Discursive Psychology, he and Derek Edwards built a specific style of work that is now commonplace in journals across the social sciences as well as indirectly fostering a swathe of non-experimental approaches to social psychology.  This took on core notions in cognitive psychology and in particular memory and attribution.  Its aim was to show that existing cognitive conceptions of these notions failed to encompass the situated and flexible nature of actual language use and to consider how peoples' accounts of cognitive processes and events are themselves parts of actions.  For example, they reanalysed Ulric Neisser's classic work on the Watergate testimony showing the way John Dean's accounts of his excellent memory were used by counsel as parts of building the case against Richard Nixon.  It was distinctive from the earlier discourse analytic approach to social psychology in its use of records of natural interaction rather than open ended interviews and its focus on sequential interaction rather than on the identification of interpretative repertoires.

In 1996 he published the book Representing Reality.  This was the fruition of a sustained engagement with the sociology of scientific knowledge and other approaches to factuality and provided an overview, extension and critique of social constructionism in social sciences.  It developed a discursive version of constructionism in contrast to the more familiar social constructionisms of thinkers such as Peter Berger and Thomas Luckmann.

His collection Conversation and Cognition, co-edited with Hedwig te Molder, brought together a group of conversation analysts, ethnothodologists and discursive psychologists (including Geoff Coulter, John Heritage, Anita Pomerantz, and Robert Hopper) to address fundamental issues at the boundary of work on cognition and interaction.

In 2007 he edited a three volume set of books that bring together a wide range of different studies in discursive psychology.

Recent work

Much of his recent work has been in collaboration with Alexa Hepburn.  They developed a programme of study using material collected from the UK National Society for the Prevention of Cruelty to Children's child protection helpline.  This has combined a theoretical interest in how ideas such as emotion and joint understanding are conceptualized in social psychological research with a focus on applied topics such as advice resistance and its management.

Their paper on problems and prospects in the use of qualitative interviews in psychology, published in Qualitative Research in Psychology, generated debate with Jonathan Smith, Wendy Hollway and Elliot Mischler.  It has been widely cited.  This stimulated a further debate in Qualitative Research with Chris Griffin and Karen Henwood.

New work is focused on studying video records of mealtime interaction in families with young children.  This has looked at actions such as directives, requests and threats and has a broader concern about the contribution of interaction analysis to the study of obesity.

In a 2010 paper in the British Journal of Social Psychology Potter summarised and continued the controversial debate over the status of discursive psychology with respect to both traditional social psychology and alternative styles of critical work.

Bibliography

Books

Book chapters

Journal articles 
 
 
 
A response to: 
Rejoinder: 
 
 
A response to:  Pdf of pp. 615–646.

References

1956 births
Academics of Loughborough University
Alumni of the University of Surrey
Living people
Scottish psychologists
Sociolinguists
People from Ashford, Kent
People from Laughton, East Sussex